Parsons Field is a 7,000-seat multi-purpose stadium in Brookline, Massachusetts. It is home to the Northeastern University baseball, men's and women's soccer, men's and women's lacrosse, men's and women's rugby as well as the Brookline High School Warriors football team. Additionally, the stadium was the home of the Northeastern Huskies football team until it was disbanded following the 2009 season. The capacity for baseball is 3,000. The facility opened in 1933.

Originally a public playground, Northeastern purchased the field (then known as Kent Street Field) from the YMCA's Huntington Prep School in 1930. In 1969, the University dedicated it to Edward S. Parsons, a former athlete, coach, and athletics director for the Huskies. The baseball diamond was named as the Friedman Diamond in 1988.  In 1994, it hosted the America East Conference baseball tournament.

In its original configuration, the baseball diamond was situated in the current east end zone.  Houses in left and center field were well within reach of hitters.

Northeastern added artificial turf to Parsons Field in 1972.  At that time, the baseball diamond was relocated to its current position in the southern corner of the property, and the distances to the left and center field fences became 330 feet and 400 feet, respectively.

See also
 List of NCAA Division I baseball venues

References

External links
 Parsons Field

1933 establishments in Massachusetts
Baseball venues in Massachusetts
Buildings and structures in Brookline, Massachusetts
College baseball venues in the United States
College soccer venues in the United States
Defunct college football venues
High school football venues in the United States
Lacrosse venues in the United States
Multi-purpose stadiums in the United States
Northeastern Huskies football
Northeastern Huskies baseball
Soccer venues in Massachusetts
Sports in Brookline, Massachusetts
Sports venues completed in 1933